William Jan Barkat is a Pakistani politician who was elected member for the 10th Provincial Assembly of Balochistan.

Political career 
William was elected in 2013 Pakistani general election to the Provincial Assembly of Balochistan on a reserved seat for minorities. He was   representing Pashtunkhwa Milli Awami Party

References 

Year of birth missing (living people)
Living people
Balochistan MPAs 2013–2018
Pashtunkhwa Milli Awami Party politicians
Politicians from Balochistan, Pakistan
Minority rights activists